Pac-Man Dash! was a side-scrolling endless runner-style game released for iOS and Android devices, by Namco Bandai Games as part of the Pac-Man series of games. The game's setting and design was primarily based on the CGI animated series Pac-Man and the Ghostly Adventures and contained many characters, references, and music tracks from it. The game was later removed from the App Store in March 2017.

Gameplay
The game had over 70 playable missions to run through and contains many unlockable transformations and vehicles for Pac-Man which can be obtained by collecting enough cookies in-game or from scanning bar-codes of Pac-Man and the Ghostly Adventuress  merchandise.

Reception

The game had received mixed to positive reviews. Metacritic gave the game a positive rating of 67 out of 100 based on 11 reviews. The game has been complimented for its entertaining value and well-polished gameplay, while some reviews have criticized its simplicity and lack of more content, but it's still marked as fun to play nonetheless.

See also
 Pac-Man and the Ghostly Adventures
 List of Pac-Man video games including other Pac-Man themed applications on iOS and Android

References

2013 video games
Bandai Namco games
IOS games
Android (operating system) games
Platform games
Pac-Man
Video games developed in Japan
Endless runner games
Single-player video games